Pangora matherana is a moth of the family Erebidae. It was described by Frederic Moore in 1879. It is found in southern India.

References

Spilosomina
Moths described in 1879